Paisley railway station was located on the Werribee line of the Melbourne suburban rail system in Australia. It was located between Newport and Galvin stations, adjacent to the Millers Road level crossing (later replaced by a road overpass).

Paisley was opened on 14 October 1929. Although it was a public platform, it played an important role in servicing refineries in the area. When the line between Altona Junction and Laverton was duplicated in 1967,
the new track ran behind the existing station, converting it into an island platform. A subway was provided to allow passengers to get to the platform from the adjacent Ross Road.

In 1985, a new extension joining Westona and Laverton stations was opened. The Werribee line had been electrified two years earlier, but after the construction of the Westona - Laverton link, trains on the Werribee line were diverted via Altona and Westona to try to make a more viable route, because both Paisley and the nearby station of Galvin were little used. As a result, Paisley, along with Galvin, were bypassed and closed. The last trains stopped at the station on 14 April 1985.

The pedestrian subway was filled in post-closure, but the island platform still exists adjacent to the Millers Road overpass in Altona, and is visible from passing suburban Werribee services, most of which ceased running on weekdays on the loop through Altona in May 2011. The former car park is now used as a bus park and ride terminal, similar to the one at Doncaster.

References

Rail Geelong - Paisley Station

Disused railway stations in Melbourne
Railway stations in Australia opened in 1929
Railway stations closed in 1985
1985 disestablishments in Australia